USS LST-454 was a United States Navy  used in the Asiatic-Pacific Theater during World War II.

Construction
LST-454 was laid down on 31 July 1942, under Maritime Commission (MARCOM) contract, MC hull 974, by  Kaiser Shipyards, Vancouver, Washington; launched on 14 October 1942; and commissioned on 26 January 1943.

Service history
During the war, LST-454 was assigned to the Pacific Theater of Operations. She took part in  the Eastern New Guinea operations, the Lae occupation in September 1943, the Finschhafen occupation in September 1943, and the Saidor occupation in January 1944; the Admiralty Islands landings in February and March 1944; the Hollandia operation in April 1944; the Western New Guinea operations, the Biak Islands operation in May and June 1944, and the Morotai landing in September 1944; the Leyte landings in October and November 1944; the Lingayen Gulf landings in January 1945; the Visayan Island landings in March and April 1945; and the Balikpapan operation in June and July 1945.

Post-war service
Following the war, LST-454 returned to the United States and was decommissioned on 25 March 1946, and struck from the Navy list on 1 May, that same year. On 3 October 1947, the ship was sold to the Patapsco Scrap Corp., of Baltimore, Maryland, and subsequently scrapped.

Honors and awards
LST-454 earned eight battle stars for her World War II service.

Notes 

Citations

Bibliography 

Online resources

External links

 

LST-1-class tank landing ships
World War II amphibious warfare vessels of the United States
1942 ships
S3-M2-K2 ships
Ships built in Vancouver, Washington